Huai Rian Railway Halt is a railway halt located in Wiang Tan Subdistrict, Hang Chat District, Lampang.

Train services 
 Local 407/408 Nakhon Sawan-Chiang Mai-Nakhon Sawan

References 
 
 

Railway stations in Thailand